Fernando Cámara is a Mexican sound engineer. He was nominated for an Academy Award in the category Best Sound Mixing for the film Apocalypto. He has worked on over 30 films since 1979.

Selected filmography
 Apocalypto (2006)

References

External links

Year of birth missing (living people)
Living people
Mexican audio engineers